Llanfair-is-gaer was an ecclesiastical parish in Caernarfon, Gwynedd: the parish church was St Mary's.

References

Hamlets in Wales
Populated places in Gwynedd